The Église Saint-Genès is a 12th-century church situated in the medieval center of Thiers in the department of Puy-de-Dôme in France.
The church possesses the biggest dome of Auvergne with a surface of 102m².

References 

Churches in Puy-de-Dôme
Roman Catholic churches in France